Edward Fitzhardinge Campbell (1880–1957) was an Irish rugby international. He won four caps between 1899 and 1900.

References
Edward Campbell at Scrum.com
IRFU Profile

1880 births
1957 deaths
Irish rugby union players
Ireland international rugby union players
Monkstown Football Club players
Rugby union wings